Gaston Tschirren (3 February 1906 – 26 February 1983) was a Swiss footballer. He competed in the men's tournament at the 1928 Summer Olympics.

References

External links
 
 

1906 births
1983 deaths
Swiss men's footballers
Switzerland international footballers
Olympic footballers of Switzerland
Footballers at the 1928 Summer Olympics
Place of birth missing
Association football forwards
FC Lausanne-Sport players
Grasshopper Club Zürich players
Servette FC players
FC La Chaux-de-Fonds players